SuperSport is a South African-based group of television channels carried on the DStv & Canal+ satellite platforms alongside the GOtv terrestrial platform and Showmax Pro for live sports programming. It provides sports content in South Africa, Nigeria and many other African countries.

SuperSport previously also had operations in Europe in the Scandinavian, Benelux, Italy, Eastern Europe, Greek & Cypriot regions and had sports channels started by FilmNet, being owned by MultiChoice at the time which have since been replaced. They also had operations in Thailand, under the current name True Sport & Egypt and Middle East via Cable Network of Egypt (CNE) & Arab Radio and Television Network respectively.

The channel broadcasts most of the major sporting events and leagues of association football, rugby, cricket, tennis, golf, motorsport, cycling, boxing, wrestling, hockey, athletics. It was formerly the world's largest broadcaster of live rugby and cricket (having been overtaken by Sky Sports), and also the world's second largest Premier League broadcaster, broadcasting matches live and, where possible, in HD through the Premier League's Content Service Sr.

Apart from its satellite channels, SuperSport also feeds content to M-Net, CSN and occasionally to M-Net HD. As of September 2020, much the same way Sky Sports has done, SuperSport started to run thematic channels with most major sports getting their own channels.

History

In 1986, M-Net was launched as South Africa's first pay-television channel and, along with Canal+, only the second outside of the United States. The channel immediately showed its intention to include sport in its programming line-up, by securing exclusive rights of an important Currie Cup match between Transvaal and Western Province for its first ever broadcast. From 1988, sports coverage on M-Net ran under the banner of M-Net SuperSport.

M-Net SuperSport expanded its range of coverage, including live overseas rugby, cricket, golf, boxing and cycling. Following South Africa's readmission into international cricket, SuperSport scored another marketing coup by securing exclusive rights to the 1992 Cricket World Cup.

When rugby turned professional in 1995, a deal was struck between the newly formed SANZAR and Rupert Murdoch's News Corporation. In South Africa, SuperSport was awarded exclusive broadcasting rights of the Super 12 competition, as well as the Tri Nations. Following this deal, rugby gradually ceased broadcasting on the SABC, while SuperSport became a carrier of live rugby broadcasts.

At the same time, Naspers expanded its pay-television operations to a satellite carrier. With the launch of DStv in 1995, SuperSport became a multi-channel network and an independent brand, although it was still primarily associated with M-Net. The network made full use of the satellite platform to expand its sports offering: For the Olympic Games, six channels are generally used for live events.

In 2007, the SABC lost its exclusive rights to the local Premier Soccer League (PSL) to SuperSport, in a deal worth R1.6 billion. The deal stipulated that some matches had to be shared with the SABC. In August 2011, SuperSport renewed its contract with the PSL for another five years.

Since 2011, SuperSport's association with M-Net began to fade, when M-Net split its terrestrial feed from its DStv channel. DStv viewers can no longer watch sports events on M-Net, although terrestrial subscribers still get feeds on the main channel, as well as the Community Services Network (CSN).

A Premier Soccer League team bears the channel's name. SuperSport United F.C. was originally known as Pretoria City but bought by M-Net in 1995 after which it was renamed.

On August 8, 2020, SuperSport announced a gradual makeover/revamp of its channels, meaning the numbering of the channels since the channel's commencement of expansion in 2003 such as SuperSport 3 would be replaced with specific-sport TV channels which they "enhances the sports viewers' experience" and "makes it easier to find and watch a favorite league, competition or sport". The revamp would be operational from September 1, 2020, onwards.

On April 22, 2021, SuperSport got ownership of School Sport Live and rebranded it into SuperSport Schools. Under the new ownership, SuperSport Schools will continue to broadcast the best of School Sports online and also through SuperSport linear channels bringing it close to their other content. In this agreement, the brand is expected to get a mobile app later in the year.

List of channels

SuperSport has 3 broadcast feeds on the African continent; South Africa, Nigeria & Rest of Africa (ROA).

South Africa

SuperSport WWE HD (128)> DStv Family
SuperSport Blitz HD (200) > DStv Access
SuperSport Grandstand HD (201)> DStv Premium
SuperSport PSL HD (202)> DStv Compact
SuperSport Premier League HD (203)> DStv Compact
SuperSport LaLiga HD (204)> DStv Family
SuperSport Football HD (205)> DStv Family
SuperSport Variety 1 HD (206)> DStv Compact Plus
SuperSport Variety 2 HD (207)> DStv Compact Plus
SuperSport Variety 3 HD (208)> DStv Compact
SuperSport Variety 4 HD (209)> DStv Access
SuperSport Action HD (210)> DStv Compact Plus
SuperSport Rugby HD (211)> DStv Premium
SuperSport Cricket HD (212)> DStv Premium
SuperSport Golf HD (213)> DStv Premium
SuperSport Tennis HD (214)> DStv Premium
SuperSport Motorsport HD (215)> DStv Premium
SuperSport Máximo 1 HD (241)> DStv Premium
SuperSport Play (243)> DStv Free To View
SuperSport OTT 1 (244) (DStv App)
SuperSport OTT 5 (245) (DStv App)
SuperSport OTT 2 (246) (DStv App)
SuperSport OTT 3 (247) (DStv App)
SuperSport OTT 4 (248) (DStv App)
SuperSport OTT 6 (950) (DStv App)
SuperSport OTT 7 (951) (DStv App)
SuperSport OTT 8 (952) (DStv App)
SuperSport CSN (490) (M-Net Terrestrial)
SuperSport Select (GOtv)

Nigeria

SuperSport WWE HD (128; GOtv Ch. 36)> DStv Confam; GOtv Supa
SuperSport Blitz HD (200, GOtv Ch. 30)> DStv Yanga; GOtv Smallie
SuperSport Grandstand HD (201)> DStv Premium
SuperSport Football Plus HD (202)> DStv Compact Plus
SuperSport Premier League HD (203)> DStv Compact
SuperSport LaLiga HD (204; GOtv Ch. 32)> DStv Confam; GOtv Max
SuperSport Football (205; GOtv Ch. 31)> DStv Yanga; GOtv Jolli
SuperSport Variety 1 HD (206)> DStv Compact Plus
SuperSport Variety 2 HD (207)> DStv Compact
SuperSport Variety 3 HD (208)> DStv Confam
SuperSport Variety 4 (209)> DStv Confam
SuperSport Action HD (210)> DStv Compact Plus
SuperSport Rugby (211)> DStv Premium
SuperSport Cricket (212)> DStv Premium
SuperSport Golf (213)> DStv Premium
SuperSport Tennis HD (214)> DStv Premium
SuperSport Motorsport HD (215)> DStv Premium
SuperSport Máximo 1 HD (241)> DStv Premium
SuperSport Máximo 2 HD (242)> DStv Premium
SuperSport OTT 1 (244) (DStv App)
SuperSport OTT 5 (245) (DStv App)
SuperSport OTT 2 (246) (DStv App)
SuperSport OTT 3 (247) (DStv App)
SuperSport OTT 4 (248) (DStv App)
SuperSport OTT 6 (950) (DStv App)
SuperSport OTT 7 (951) (DStv App)
SuperSport OTT 8 (952) (DStv App)
SuperSport Select 1 (GOtv Ch. 33)> GOtv Max
SuperSport Select 2 (GOtv Ch. 34)> GOtv Jinja

Rest Of Africa

Most of the channels for SuperSport Nigeria are shared with the Rest of African (ROA) Feed, excluding only 3 channels as SuperSport has catered for a separate ROA feed for these. They are SS Football Plus, SS Premier League & SS LaLiga. The Sub-Saharan African feed is divided into 2 zones, Anglophone Africa (English-speaking countries) & Lusophone Africa (Portuguese-speaking countries).

Anglophone Africa

SuperSport WWE HD (128; GOtv Ch. 36)> DStv Family; GOtv Supa
SuperSport PSL HD (202)> DStv Compact (Southern Africa only)
SuperSport Blitz HD (220; GOtv Ch. 30)> DStv Access; GOtv Lite
SuperSport Grandstand HD (221)> DStv Premium
SuperSport Football Plus HD (222)> DStv Compact Plus
SuperSport Premier League HD (223; Canal+ Rwanda Ch. 433)> DStv Compact; Canal+ English Plus
SuperSport LaLiga HD (224; GOtv Ch. 32; Canal+ Rwanda Ch. 434)> DStv Family; GOtv Max; Canal+ English Plus
SuperSport Football (225; GOtv Ch. 31)> DStv Access; GOtv Plus
SuperSport Variety 1 HD (226)> DStv Compact Plus
SuperSport Variety 2 HD (227)> DStv Compact
SuperSport Variety 3 HD (228)> DStv Family
SuperSport Variety 4 (229)> DStv Access
SuperSport Action HD (230)> DStv Compact Plus
SuperSport Rugby (231)> DStv Premium
SuperSport Cricket (232)> DStv Premium
SuperSport Golf (233)> DStv Premium
SuperSport Tennis HD (234)> DStv Premium
SuperSport Motorsport HD (235)> DStv Premium
SuperSport Liyu HD (240)> DStv Family
SuperSport Máximo 1 HD (241)> DStv Premium
SuperSport Máximo 2 HD (242)> DStv Premium
SuperSport Play (243)> DStv Free To View (Southern Africa only)
SuperSport OTT 1 (244) (DStv App)
SuperSport OTT 5 (245) (DStv App)
SuperSport OTT 2 (246) (DStv App)
SuperSport OTT 3 (247) (DStv App)
SuperSport OTT 4 (248) (DStv App)
SuperSport OTT 6 (950) (DStv App)
SuperSport OTT 7 (951) (DStv App)
SuperSport OTT 8 (952) (DStv App)
SuperSport Select 1 (GOtv Ch. 33)> GOtv Max
SuperSport Select 2 (GOtv Ch. 34)> GOtv Value

Lusophone Africa
(Applies mainly in Angola & Mozambique)

SuperSport Blitz HD (600; GOtv Ch. 30)
SuperSport Máximo 1 HD (601)
SuperSport Máximo 2 HD (602)
SuperSport Máximo 3 HD (603)
SuperSport Máximo 360 (604; GOtv Ch. 35)
SuperSport WWE HD (620; GOtv Ch. 36)
SuperSport Grandstand HD (621)
SuperSport Football Plus HD (622)
SuperSport Premier League HD (623)
SuperSport LaLiga HD (624; GOtv Ch. 32)
SuperSport Football (625; GOtv Ch. 31)
SuperSport Variety 1 HD (626)
SuperSport Variety 2 HD (627)
SuperSport Variety 3 HD (628)
SuperSport Variety 4 (629)
SuperSport Action HD (630)
SuperSport Rugby (631)
SuperSport Cricket (632)
SuperSport Golf (633)
SuperSport Tennis HD (634)
SuperSport Motorsport HD (635)
SuperSport OTT 1 (244) (DStv App)
SuperSport OTT 5 (245) (DStv App)
SuperSport OTT 2 (246) (DStv App)
SuperSport OTT 3 (247) (DStv App)
SuperSport OTT 4 (248) (DStv App)
SuperSport OTT 6 (950) (DStv App)
SuperSport OTT 7 (951) (DStv App)
SuperSport OTT 8 (952) (DStv App)
SuperSport Select 1 (GOtv Ch. 33)
SuperSport Select 2 (GOtv Ch. 34)

SuperSport Blitz (200)
SuperSport Blitz, formerly known as SuperSport Update, was launched on 1 October 2006 & remains undoubtedly to be Africa's premier dedicated 24-hour sports news channel featuring the latest news, features, announcements, highlights, previews & sporting events all around the world. For some hours it relays Sky Sports News live from the UK.

SuperSport Grandstand (201)
SuperSport's top channel which features the best of the day's live content including top events from tennis, rugby, cricket and live WWE pay-per-views. This channel is only available to DStv Premium subscribers.

SuperSport PSL (202)
SuperSport PSL focuses mainly on domestic soccer matches in South Africa and other African countries through live broadcasts, magazine shows and highlights. They now show Premier Soccer League (PSL) matches every Tuesday, Wednesday, Friday, Saturday and Sunday as part of their "Super Diski" shows. The channel also shows many PSL themed news and talk shows under the "PSL TV" brand. These shows air at least one new show nightly. They include Extra Time, Back Pages, Mzansi Legends, National First Division Show, PSL News, Thursday Night Live With Robert Marawa, Love PSL and various club magazine shows. All local matches have Zulu and Sesotho commentary.

As this channel is locally oriented (South Africa), it is included on the Compact bouquet for South African & Southern African viewers.

SuperSport Football Plus (202)
SuperSport Football Plus is a 24-hour dedicated football/soccer channel, specifically made for as the new home of UEFA Champions League for ROA Viewers alongside featured soccer documentaries, shows, news & matches. It also acts as a soccer overflow channel broadcasting other live fixtures when other SuperSport channels are occupied with live events.

This channel is available for Nigeria (Ch. 202) & The Rest of African (ROA》Ch. 222/622) audiences on the DStv Compact Plus package.

SuperSport Premier League (203)
SuperSport Premier League is a 24-hour football/soccer channel. SuperSport has the exclusive rights of telecasting the Premier League as well as the UEFA Champions League (For South African Viewers), and other major football tournaments. It is available on the DStv Compact & Canal+ English Plus (Rwanda) packages.

SuperSport LaLiga (204)
Home of the Spanish LaLiga & UEFA Europa League while also showcasing overflow matches from the UEFA Champions League.

In South Africa & The Rest of Africa, The channel is available to DStv Family customers, as well as DStv Confam (Nigeria), GOtv Max (Nigeria & ROA) & Canal+ English Plus (Rwanda)

SuperSport Football (205)
Primarily showcases Italy's Serie A while also broadcasting matches from the Premier League, UEFA Champions League and UEFA Europa League, and selected international matches. The channel is available for DStv Family and upper packages in South Africa

The Nigerian & ROA Channel usually broadcasts delayed as well as a select number of live matches from the Premier League, LaLiga, Serie A and the Premier Soccer League (PSL) as well as UEFA Europa League & Ethiopian Football matches. The channel is available for DStv Access and GOtv Plus for Rest Of Africa customers & DStv Yanga and GOtv Jolli for Nigerian customers.

SuperSport Variety 1 (206)
Variety 1 focuses on cycling and swimming events while also functioning as an overflow channel for soccer, golf, tennis, rugby and cricket events.

As the channel includes involvement with overflow content with rugby, tennis and other Premium sports, the channel is available to DStv Compact Plus customers in South Africa & The Rest Of Africa (incl. Nigeria)

SuperSport Variety 2 (207)
Variety 2 features gymnastics, hockey, sailing and squash events while also functioning as an overflow channel for soccer matches.

The channel is available to DStv Compact Plus (South Africa) & DStv Compact (Nigeria & Rest Of Africa) customers as part of the offering SuperSport gives

SuperSport Variety 3 (208)
Variety 3 broadcasts athletics events, marathons, UEFA Europa Conference League, live WWE & UFC programming including pay-per-view events, and also functions as an overflow for some soccer matches from the PSL, Premier League & UEFA Champions League for South African viewers. The channel is available for DStv Compact subscribers.

With the exclusion of overflow PSL, Premier League & UEFA Champions League matches as well as live UFC PPVs for Nigeria & Rest Of African audiences, the channel primarily broadcasts Italian Serie A. The channel, which also resembles Select 1 for GOtv subscribers, is available for DStv Confam (Nigeria), DStv Family & GOtv Max subscribers.

SuperSport Variety 4 (219)
Variety 4 focuses on grassroot sports including varsity rugby, netball, BNL, DStv Diski Challenge, SRC, as well as WWE highlights in South Africa. The channel is offered under the DStv Access package.

For Nigeria & ROA audiences (Channel resembles Select 2 on GOtv), it focuses on African sports including live football from Zambia & South Africa (PSL), magazine & variety shows as well as WWE highlights. The channel is offered under the DStv Access and GOtv Value packages for ROA & DStv Confam and GOtv Jinja in Nigeria.

SuperSport Action (210)
SuperSport Action broadcasts a range of extreme sports as well as major boxing matches, UFC and EFC mixed martial arts programming and overflow content from rugby, soccer and cricket.

Available to DStv Compact Plus customers

SuperSport Rugby (211)
SuperSport Rugby is the channel which focuses mainly on rugby. It shows all national team rugby matches live, as well as all Super Rugby fixtures, the Currie Cup, Varsity Rugby and certain top high school and club matches. Most matches have commentary in both English and Afrikaans, with a growing number also featuring a Xhosa feed.

As the world's  second largest broadcaster of live rugby, SuperSport's commentators read like a "who's who" of South African rugby greats. Current lead commentators in English are Matthew Pearce, Hugh Bladen, Gavin Cowley, Owen Nkumane and Paul Stubbs, while their analyst pool includes Joel Stransky, Gcobani Bobo, Bobby Skinstad, Breyton Paulse, Nick Mallett, Ashwin Willemse, Kobus Wiese, Victor Matfield, Jean de Villiers and Naas Botha.

As a large broadcaster with expensive rights to the sport, the channel is exclusively on DStv Premium.

SuperSport Cricket (212)
SuperSport Cricket primarily shows Cricket. All international cricket involving the South African national cricket team, as well as certain domestic cricket, is shown on this channel. The presentation and commentary team who cover South African home games include Mark Nicholas, Mike Haysman, Pommie Mbangwa, Michael Holding, Shaun Pollock, Makhaya Ntini, JP Duminy and guest pundits from the opposition team.

The channel is also available only on DStv Premium

SuperSport Golf (213)
SuperSport Golf is the home of the majors with coverage of the PGA tour and other major golfing events including the Open, The Masters and many more.

This channel is available only on DStv Premium

SuperSport Tennis (214)
SuperSport Tennis is a 24-hour dedicated tennis channel showcasing live tennis from Grand Slams to the ATP World Tour, WTA & other major tennis events.

Available to DStv Premium customers

SuperSport Motorsport (215)
SuperSport Motorsport features live and archive content from the world of motorsports including Formula 1, DTM, MotoGP, Superbikes, Formula E, NASCAR and more.

Exclusive to DStv Premium

SuperSport WWE (128)
In addition to the WWE Network being made locally available, SuperSport's WWE channel features live broadcasts of WWE's flagship programming of WWE Raw and WWE SmackDown, along with additional WWE Network content including pay-per-view events, WWE NXT, WWE 24, WWE Ride Along and more.

SuperSport Maximo (241)
SuperSport Maximo is the Portuguese-language channel broadcasting the same events from the other SuperSport channels. It is available mainly in the countries of Lusophone Africa, but also in other African countries including South Africa.

Broadcasting rights

Multi-sport events
Olympic Games
Winter Olympic Games
Paralympic Games
Commonwealth Games
All Africa Games

Athletics
Wanda Diamond League
World Athletics Championships

American Football
National Football League

Basketball
National Basketball Association

Cricket

Domestic
International cricket in South Africa
1 Day Cup
T20 Domestic Series
CSA T20 Challenge

International
ICC Cricket World Cup
ICC Under-19 Cricket World Cup
ICC Women's Cricket World Cup
ICC Under-19 Women's Twenty20 World Cup
ICC Champions Trophy
ICC Men's T20 World Cup
ICC Women's T20 World Cup
DP World Asia Cup
HBL Pakistan Super League
TATA Indian Premier League
TATA Women's Premier League
My 11 Circle Women's T20 Challenge
KFC Big Bash League
Weber Women's Big Bash League
Dream11 Super Smash
Vitality T20 Blast
SA20
The Hundred
Hero Caribbean Premier League
International cricket in Australia
International cricket in Bangladesh
International cricket in England
International cricket in India
International cricket in Ireland
International cricket in New Zealand
International cricket in Pakistan
International cricket in Sri Lanka
International cricket in West Indies
International cricket in Zimbabwe

Futsal

FIFA Futsal World Cup

Football

Domestic
 DStv Premiership
 Nedbank Cup
 MTN 8
 Carling Black Label Cup
 National First Division
 DStv Diski Challenge
 Varsity Football
 Philly's Games (amateur football)

International
FIFA World Cup
FIFA World Cup qualification
FIFA Women's World Cup
FIFA U-17 Women's World Cup
FIFA U-20 Women's World Cup
FIFA Beach Soccer World Cup
TotalEnergies CAF Africa Cup Of Nations
TotalEnergies CAF African Nations Championship
TotalEnergies CAF Women's Africa Cup of Nations
TotalEnergies CAF Champions League
TotalEnergies CAF Women's Champions League
TotalEnergies CAF Confederation Cup
TotalEnergies CAF Super Cup
UEFA European Championship
UEFA European Championship qualifying
UEFA European Women's Championship
UEFA Nations League
Finalissima
UEFA Champions League
UEFA Europa League 
UEFA Europa Conference League
UEFA Youth League
UEFA Super Cup
UEFA Nations League
Premier League
Barclays Women's Super League
Emirates FA Cup
FA Community Shield
Carabao Cup
Sky Bet Championship (Selected Matches)
La Liga Santander
La Liga Smartbank (Promotional Playoffs only)
Serie A TIM
HollywoodBets COSAFA Cup
HollywoodBets COSAFA Women's Championship
HollywoodBets COSAFA Beach Soccer Championship
MTN FAZ Super Division (Rest of Africa only)
BetKing Ethiopian Premier League

Rugby
Rugby World Cup
Women's Rugby World Cup
Rugby World Cup Sevens
Super Rugby
The Rugby Championship
Six Nations Championship
Currie Cup
Varsity Cup
National Rugby League
Gallagher Premiership Rugby
European Champions Cup
United Rugby Championship
World Rugby Sevens Series
World Rugby Women's Sevens Series

Golf
The Masters
U.S Open
The Open Championship
Presidents Cup
PGA Championship
PGA Tour
European Tour
Ryder Cup
LIV Golf
Sunshine Tour
Nedbank Golf Challenge

Tennis
Wimbledon
Roland Garros
Australian Open
Laver Cup
Davis Cup
United Cup
US Open
ATP World Tour
WTA Tour
International Premier Tennis League

Motorsport
Formula One
Formula E 
Extreme E
MotoGP
Deutsche Tourenwagen Masters
Superbike World Championship
S.A. National Rally Championship
NASCAR
V8 Supercars
GT Asia Series
TCR Asia Series
FIA European Truck Racing Championship
FIA World Rallycross Championship
FIA Cross-Country Rally World Cup
TCR International Series
IndyCar

Hockey
Men's FIH Hockey World Cup
Women's FIH Hockey World Cup
Men's FIH Hockey Junior World Cup
Women's FIH Hockey Junior World Cup

Netball
Netball World Cup

Cycling
Giro d'Italia
Tour de France
Vuelta a España

Boxing
HBO World Championship Boxing
Premier Boxing Champions

Professional Wrestling
WWE

Polo and Horse racing
As seen on the show Poloin.Africa presented by Malwandla Hlekane

MMA
UFC
As of 17 January 2019 started broadcasting UFC pay-per-view events live .
EFC
It also earned the rights for EFC events starting from March, 2019.

See also
M-Net
Filmnet
K-T.V.

References

External links 
 

Television stations in South Africa
English-language television stations in South Africa
Sports television networks
Television channels and stations established in 1988
1988 establishments in South Africa